Higher Education Mega Center North Station is a station of Line 4 of the Guangzhou Metro. It started operations on 26 December 2005. It is located at the underground of the north of Guangzhou Higher Education Mega Center, located on the Xiaoguwei Island in Xiaoguwei Subdistrict, Panyu District.

The station was previously called "Beiting Station" because of nearby Beiting Village on the island. But since May 2006, it changed name to Higher Education Mega Center North Station.

Station layout

Exits

References

Guangzhou Higher Education Mega Center
Railway stations in China opened in 2005
Guangzhou Metro stations in Panyu District
Railway stations in China at university and college campuses